The 1992–93 New Jersey Nets season was the Nets' 26th season in the National Basketball Association, and 17th season in East Rutherford, New Jersey. The Nets hired Chuck Daly as head coach, acquired Rumeal Robinson from the Atlanta Hawks, acquired Jayson Williams from the Philadelphia 76ers, and signed free agents Chucky Brown and Rick Mahorn during the off-season. Under Daly, the Nets continued to improve holding a 30–21 record at the All-Star break. However, they would lose second-year star Kenny Anderson for the remainder of the season to a wrist injury after 55 games. At midseason, the Nets signed free agents, former All-Star guard Maurice Cheeks, and former All-Star forward Bernard King. Despite losing ten of their final eleven games, the team finished third in the Atlantic Division with a 43–39 record.

Dražen Petrović and Derrick Coleman were both selected to the All-NBA Third Team, as Petrović led the team in scoring averaging 22.3 points per game, and Coleman averaged 20.7 points, 11.2 rebounds and 1.7 blocks per game. In addition, Anderson provided the team with 16.9 points, 8.2 assists and 1.7 steals per game in his first season as a starter, and finished in third place in Most Improved Player voting, while Chris Morris contributed 14.1 points, 5.9 rebounds and 1.9 steals per game, and Sam Bowie provided with 9.1 points, 7.0 rebounds and 1.6 blocks per game. The club qualified for the playoffs, but were eliminated in the Eastern Conference First Round by the Cleveland Cavaliers in five games.

Following the season, tragedy struck as Petrović was killed in a car accident in Munich, Germany at the age of 28 on June 7, 1993. The Nets retired his #3 jersey, as Petrović would later on be inducted into the Basketball Hall of Fame posthumously. 

Also following the season, Bowie was traded to the Los Angeles Lakers, while Chris Dudley signed as a free agent with the Portland Trail Blazers, Brown signed with the Dallas Mavericks, and King and Cheeks both retired.

Draft picks

Roster

Roster notes
 Point guard Rumeal Robinson holds both American and Jamaican citizenships.

Regular season

Season standings

z – clinched division title
y – clinched division title
x – clinched playoff spot

Record vs. opponents

Playoffs

|- align="center" bgcolor="#ffcccc"
| 1
| April 29
| @ Cleveland
| L 98–114
| Derrick Coleman (31)
| Derrick Coleman (10)
| Cheeks, George (5)
| Richfield Coliseum18,339
| 0–1
|- align="center" bgcolor="#ccffcc"
| 2
| May 1
| @ Cleveland
| W 101–99
| Derrick Coleman (27)
| Derrick Coleman (14)
| Rumeal Robinson (9)
| Richfield Coliseum20,273
| 1–1
|- align="center" bgcolor="#ffcccc"
| 3
| May 5
| Cleveland
| L 84–93
| Derrick Coleman (22)
| Derrick Coleman (13)
| Rumeal Robinson (9)
| Brendan Byrne Arena16,453
| 1–2
|- align="center" bgcolor="#ccffcc"
| 4
| May 7
| Cleveland
| W 96–79
| Brad Daugherty (29)
| Derrick Coleman (14)
| Coleman, Robinson (8)
| Brendan Byrne Arena15,238
| 2–2
|- align="center" bgcolor="#ffcccc"
| 1
| May 9
| @ Cleveland
| L 89–99
| Derrick Coleman (33)
| Derrick Coleman (16)
| Rumeal Robinson (6)
| Richfield Coliseum17,388
| 2–3

Player statistics

Regular season

Playoffs

Player Statistics Citation:

Awards, Records and Honors
 Dražen Petrović, All-NBA Third Team
 Derrick Coleman, All-NBA Third Team

Transactions

References

New Jersey Nets season
New Jersey Nets seasons
New Jersey Nets
New Jersey Nets
20th century in East Rutherford, New Jersey
Meadowlands Sports Complex